The siege of Athens lasted through 287 BC when the city was put under siege by King Demetrius I of Macedon. Athens revolted in that year against Demetrius' rule and elected Olympiodorus as strategos. Olympiodorus raised a force among the Athenian citizens, including old men and children, and attacked the Macedonian garrison that had retreated to the fort at the Museum hill which he took with the loss of just 13 of his men.

On receiving news of the revolt Demetrius gathered forces from the cities he still held and put Athens under siege. The Athenians sent the philosopher Crates to negotiate with Demetrius. In the treaty signed Demetrius received some fortresses in Attica but Athens was freed from a Macedonian garrison.

References 
Notes

Sources

287 BC
Athens -287
Athens
Athens -287
Ancient Attica
280s BC conflicts